Captain Carey, U.S.A. is a 1949 American crime film noir directed by Mitchell Leisen and starring Alan Ladd and Wanda Hendrix. An American returns to post–World War II Italy to bring a traitor to justice.

The film was based on the novel After Midnight by Martha Albrand.  It was filmed under the title O.S.S. and then the title After Midnight.

The theme song, "Mona Lisa", was performed in the film by Charlie Spivak with Tommy Lynn. Jay Livingston and Ray Evans won the Academy Award for Best Original Song. It was a #1 hit for Nat King Cole in 1950.

Plot
A group of agents of the U.S. Office of Strategic Services (a forerunner of the Central Intelligence Agency) is sent to German-occupied Italy during World War II to knock out the German-held Italian railroad system. In accomplishing this mission, most of them are killed because of an inside betrayal.

After the war, one of the survivors, Captain Webster Carey (Alan Ladd), resolves to find the traitor. Captain Carey returns to Orta, near Milan, to find out who betrayed his World War II O.S.S. team and caused the deaths of several villagers. Much to his surprise, his old love Giulia (Wanda Hendrix), whom he thought dead at the hands of the Nazis, is alive and married to a powerful Italian nobleman, Barone Rocco de Greffi (Francis Lederer). The villagers are unfriendly, but Carey persists in his clandestine efforts to flush out the traitor, Barone Rocco de Greffi (Francis Lederer).

Cast
Alan Ladd as Captain Webster Carey
Wanda Hendrix as Baronessa Giulia de Greffi
Francis Lederer as Barone Rocco de Greffi
Joseph Calleia as Dr. Lunati
Celia Lovsky as Countess Francesca de Cresci
Richard Avonde as Count Carlo de Cresci
Frank Puglia as Luigi
Luis Alberni as Sandro
Angela Clarke as Serafina
Roland Winters as Manfredo Acuto
Paul Lees as Frank
Jane Nigh as Nancy
Russ Tamblyn as Pietro (as Rusty Tamblyn)
Virginia Farmer as Angelina
David Leonard as Blind Musician
Ernő Verebes as Detective
Ray Walker as Mr. Simmons
Argentina Brunetti as Villager (uncredited)
Gino Corrado as Villager (uncredited)

Production
The film was based on the serial Dishonored. Jonathan Latimer was originally announced as screenwriter and the stars were to be Ray Milland and Alida Valli, with the title to be After Midnight.

Then Alan Ladd was given the lead role, and Lewis Allen meant to direct. Eventually Mitchell Leisen was given the job of directing.

Filming started 3 January 1949.

Accolades

The film is recognized by American Film Institute in these lists:
 2004: AFI's 100 Years...100 Songs:	
 "Mona Lisa" – Nominated

Notes 

The fictional film seems to recall real places and real events: the setting in Orta San Giulio, Lake Orta, Villa Castelnuovo and the Major of the United States of America Army William H. Holohan who on the night of the 6th December 1944, Commander of a secret mission behind enemy lines in charge of coordinating allied supplies to the partisan formations, with a secret refuge in a difficult to reach Villa and with a suitcase with a lot of money destined for the partisan formations, mysteriously disappeared in San Maurizio d ' Opaglio on Lake Orta during a Nazi attack; his brother who in the following years investigates, listens to witnesses, writes letters and one of these arrives in the hands of a Carabiniere who in turn investigates, collects elements until the confession of a murder by poisoning and with gunshots from fire, and the discovery of the body 5 years later, by order of the Partisan Chief Vincenzo "Cino" Moscatelli, as admitted by himself to Edward Bennett Williams and FBI later when he was Senator of the Italian Communist Party.

References

External links

Captain Carey, U.S.A. at the Movie Review Query Engine

1950 films
1950 crime drama films
Films that won the Best Original Song Academy Award
American black-and-white films
Films based on American novels
Films based on German novels
Films scored by Hugo Friedhofer
Paramount Pictures films
Films directed by Mitchell Leisen
Films set in Italy
American World War II films
American crime drama films
1950s English-language films
1950s American films